Beware of Blondes can refer to:

 Beware of Blondes (1928 film), a 1928 American film
 Beware of Blondes (1950 film), a 1950 French film